Laurie Schwab (died June 1997) was an Australian journalist and broadcaster. Schwab was best known as a soccer writer for The Age newspaper in Melbourne.

Early life
Schwab was the son of German immigrants and grew up in St Albans, Victoria.

Journalism
He joined The Age in the early 1970s where he soon became a soccer writer. He later founded and edited a specialised soccer newspaper, Soccer Action, published by The Age's parent company Fairfax. He also occasionally commentated on the game for ABC Radio.

For his services to soccer he was posthumously inducted into the Australian Football Hall of Fame in 1999.

References

Journalists from Melbourne
Australian radio personalities
Australian radio presenters
Australian sports journalists
Australian people of German descent
1997 deaths
Year of birth missing
People from the City of Brimbank
20th-century Australian journalists